Pyxicephalus cordofanus, also known as Rana cordofana, is a possible species of frog. It is a nomen dubium, a name of unknown application. Franz Steindachner, who described the species in 1867, specified neither a holotype nor syntypes. The syntypes are believed to be at the Natural History Museum, Vienna (NHMW), possibly including the specimen NHMW 2673. The International Union for Conservation of Nature lists it as "data deficient", citing "continuing doubts as to its taxonomic validity, extent of occurrence, status and ecological requirements".

Description
The original species description, based on two specimens, is summarized as follows:
Head considerably narrower, snout longer and sharper than in the two species mentioned earlier [=Pyxicephalus adspersus, Pyxicephalus delalandii]; Tongue roundish, at the posterior margin only very slightly constricted, tongue lobes very short; Back with brownish marbling and small spots; Tympanum (anatomy) indistinctly visible; A small clump on the outer edge of the metatarsus.

Distribution
It is only known from its type locality, "Cordofan", Egypt", an area that falls within the present-day Sudan, thus making this taxon a Sudanese endemic.

Ecology
The ecology of this taxon is unknown, but it is presumed to be an aquatic species.

References

Frogs of Africa
Vertebrates of Sudan
Endemic fauna of Sudan
Amphibians described in 1867
Taxa named by Franz Steindachner
Taxonomy articles created by Polbot